This article lists the Canadian number-one albums of 1976. The chart was compiled and published by RPM every Saturday.

The top position [December 27, 1975, Vol. 24, No. 14] preceding January 10 [Vol. 24, No. 15] was Elton John's Rock of the Westies. Stevie Wonder's Songs in the Key of Life entered the chart at #1. Three acts held the top position in the albums and singles charts simultaneously: The Bay City Rollers on March 13, Wings on June 5–12 and Rod Stewart on December 18.)

(Entries with dates marked thus* are not presently on record at Library and Archives Canada and were inferred from the following week's listing.)

References

See also
1976 in music
RPM number-one hits of 1976

1976
1976 in Canadian music